Eva Lucia Saulitis (May 10, 1963 – January 16, 2016) was an American marine biologist and poet, based in Alaska.

Early life and education 
Saulitis was born in the Bronx and raised Silver Creek, New York, the daughter of Latvian immigrants Janis (John) Saulitis and Asja Ivins Saulitis. She studied oboe at Northwestern University, before changing schools and majors to complete a bachelor's degree in environmental science at Syracuse SUNY ESF (Environmental Science and Forestry). She earned a master's degree in marine biology at the University of Alaska Fairbanks in 1993, and a second master's degree, in creative writing, in 1999.

Career 
Saulitis studied pods of orcas in Prince William Sound. Saulitis taught creative writing at Kenai Peninsula College, and in the University of Alaska Anchorage's MFA program. She was one of the founders of the Kachemak Bay Writers' Conference, and co-founder of the North Gulf Oceanic Society. She was involved in impact studies and restoration efforts following the 1989 Exxon Valdez oil spill.

In 2013, Saulitis received the Alaska Governor's Award for the Arts and Humanities. In 2015, she was awarded the Homer Arts Council's Lifetime Achievement Award.

Publications

Marine biology 

 "Foraging Strategies of Sympatric Killer Whale (Orcinis orca) Populations in Prince William Sound, Alaska" (2000, with Craig Matkin, Lance Barrett-Lennard, Kathy Heise, and Graeme Ellis)
 "Distribution of Killer Whale Pods in Prince William Sound, Alaska, 1984-1996" (2001, with D. Scheel and Craig Matkin)
 "Examining the evidence for killer whale predation on Steller sea lions in British Columbia and Alaska" (2003, with Kathy Heise, Lance Barrett-Lennard, Craig Matkin and David Bain)
 "Vocal repertoire and acoustic behavior of the isolated AT1 killer whale subpopulation in southern Alaska" (2005, with Craig Matkin and Francis H. Fay)
 "Predation on gray whales and prolonged feeding on submerged carcasses by transient killer whales at Unimak Island, Alaska" (2011, with Lance Barrett-Lennard, Craig Matkin, John W. Durban, and David Ellifrit)
 "Life history and population dynamics of southern Alaska resident killer whales (Orcinus orca )" (2014, with Craig Matkin, J. Ward Testa, and Graeme Ellis)

Poetry, memoir, essays 
 "Ghosts of the Island" (1998, essay)
 Leaving Resurrection: Chronicles of a Whale Scientist (2008, essays)
 Many Ways to Say It (2012, poetry)
 Into Great Silence: A Memoir of Discovery and Loss Among Vanishing Orcas (2013, memoir)
 Prayer in Wind (2015, poetry)
 Becoming Earth (2016, essays, published posthumously)

Personal life and legacy 
Saulitis and her husband, biologist Craig Matkin, had homes in Alaska and in Hawai'i. She died in 2016, aged 52, from breast cancer, at her home in Homer, Alaska. In preparation for her own death, she and her family built her coffin together, woven from branches and grasses found in their surroundings. She wrote, in her final message to her loved ones, "It was a good day to die, because it was such a good life to have lived." A scholarship fund at the University of Alaska Anchorage was named for Saulitis. In 2019, Randon Billings Noble of The Rumpus recommended Saulitis's Leaving Resurrection in a list titled "What to Read When You’re Haunted".

References

External links 

 Eva Saulitis poetry read by her sister Mara, for the Alaska Quarterly Review in 2022; on YouTube
 Alaskan in Cancerland, Saulitis's blog

1963 births
2016 deaths
American marine biologists
American people of Latvian descent
American women poets
People from Homer, Alaska
Syracuse University alumni
University of Alaska Fairbanks alumni
University of Alaska Anchorage faculty
Deaths from breast cancer
People from Silver Creek, New York